Cleopatra Coleman (born 29 October 1987) is an Australian actress. She is known for playing Erica on the American comedy series The Last Man on Earth and Rya in the Netflix original sci-fi thriller In the Shadow of the Moon.

Early life
Coleman was born in Wentworth Falls, to a Jamaican-born mother, Turquoise Coleman, and Mick Coleman, an Australian father of Scottish descent, and moved to  Byron Bay, New South Wales when she was 18 months old.

Career
Coleman started her professional film and television career in her home country of Australia at age 15. In 2005 Coleman was cast as a lead in the sci-fi teenage drama Silversun for  ABC and Seven Network.

In 2006, Coleman was cast as Glenn Forrest in the long running Australian soap opera Neighbours. Coleman went on to appear in other Australian television programs, including Blue Heelers, Holly's Heroes, Wicked Science, City Homicide and Rush.

In 2008, Coleman appeared in a stage production of Simon Stephens' Motortown with Melbourne's Red Stitch Actors Theatre, receiving positive reviews.

In 2011, Coleman co-wrote, executive-produced, and starred in the short film Trains, the first project for Coleman/Coleman productions, created by Cleopatra and her father, Mick Coleman.

In the same year, she was cast in her breakout motion picture role as DJ Penelope in Step Up Revolution, a film released on 27 July 2012. She also featured in multiple music videos by Nervo ("You're Gonna Love Again"), Far East Movement ("Change Your Life") and Galantis ("Runaway (U & I)") in 2014.

In 2014, Coleman was cast as a series regular in the Fox ensemble comedy series The Last Man on Earth. She played the role of Erica Dundee for four seasons.

In 2016, Coleman guest-starred in the series Better Things. A year later, she wrote, produced, and starred in the environmental sci-fi thriller Hover for Syfy Films. The same year, she starred as Sadie Lewis in the Showtime comedy White Famous which ran for one season.

In 2019, Coleman guest-starred in Gregg Araki's Now Apocalypse and critically acclaimed series Sorry for Your Loss. The same year, she also appeared as Rya in In the Shadow of the Moon for Netflix, directed by Jim Mickle. In 2020, Cleopatra played Trina in the quirky independent comedy The Argument, directed by Robert Schwartzman.

In 2021, Coleman played the bubbly and charismatic Sarah, the female lead of The Right One, a romantic comedy that was written and directed by Ken Mok and released through Lionsgate. She also starred in the music video for "Ceremony" by Deftones.

Filmography

References

External links

Cleopatra Coleman official website

1987 births
Australian people of Jamaican descent
Australian people of Scottish descent
Australian soap opera actresses
Australian stage actresses
Living people
21st-century Australian actresses
People from the Blue Mountains (New South Wales)